Caligo oedipus, the boomerang owl, is a butterfly of the family Nymphalidae. The species can be found from Central America to Colombia.

Subspecies
C. o. fruhstorferi Stichel, 1904
C. o. oedipus

References

Butterflies described in 1903
Caligo
Butterflies of Central America
Nymphalidae of South America
Taxa named by Hans Ferdinand Emil Julius Stichel